Ahmed Adil is a citizen of China who was held in extrajudicial detention in the United States Guantanamo Bay detainment camps in Cuba.

Detention 
Adil's Guantanamo Internment Serial Number was 260. American intelligence analysts estimate he was born in 1973 in Kashgar, Xinjiang, China.

Adil is one of approximately two dozen detainees from the Uyghur ethnic group. Adil is one of approximately half a dozen Uyghurs whose Combatant Status Review Tribunals determined they were not enemy combatants after all.
Five of the Uyghurs were transferred to Albania.
Several others had new Tribunals convened that reversed the earlier determination.

Alleged affiliation with Eastern Turkistan Islamic Movement

He is one of approximately two dozen Uyghur captives accused by security officials of membership in the Eastern Turkistan Islamic Movement, which China considers to be both terrorist and secessionist.

Documents released in response to the writ of habeas corpus Hassan Anvar v. George W. Bush contained a December 30, 2004 memo which provided one-paragraph information of 22 Uyghur detainees, all the detainees faced allegations from Joint Task Force Guantanamo intelligence officials of having received training at an "ETIM training camp".

The information about Ahmed Adil stated:
{| class="wikitable"
|
Ahmed Adil is a 31-year-old Chinese Citizen who is an ethnic Uighur from the Xinjiang province of China. Adil was last interviewed in the end of 2002. He has no reported incidents of violence in his discipline history. Adil is suspected as  being a probable member of the East Turkistan Islamic Movement (ETIM). He is suspected of having received training in an ETIM training camp in Afghanistan.
|}

The information paper also identified him as "Ahnad Adil".

Combatant Status Review 
The Bush administration asserted that: 
the protections of the Geneva Conventions did not extend to captured prisoners who are not members of the regular Afghan armed force nor meet the criteria for prisoner of war for voluntary forces. 
Critics argued the Conventions obliged the U.S. to conduct competent tribunals to determine the status of prisoners. Subsequently, the U.S. Department of Defense instituted Combatant Status Review Tribunals (CSRTs), to determine whether detainees met the new definition of an "enemy combatant".  

"Enemy combatant" was defined by the U.S. Department of Defense as: 
an individual who was part of, or supporting, the Taliban, or al-Qaeda forces, or associated forces that are engaged in hostilities against the United States or its coalition partners.  This includes any person who commits a belligerent act or has directly supported hostilities in aid of enemy armed forces.

The CSRTs are not bound by the rules of evidence that would normally apply in civilian court, and the government’s evidence is presumed to be “genuine and accurate.”
From July 2004 through March 2005, CSRTs were convened to determine whether each prisoner had been correctly classified as an "enemy combatant". 

 was among the 60% of prisoners who chose to participate in tribunal hearings. A Summary of Evidence memo was prepared for the tribunal of each detainee, listing the allegations that supported their detention as an "enemy combatant". 

's memo accused him of the following:

On March 3, 2006, in response to a court order from Jed Rakoff the Department of Defense published a six page summarized transcript from his Combatant Status Review Tribunal.

Letter to the Secretary of State 

Adil wrote to Secretary of State Condoleezza Rice on January 19, 2006.  In his letter, and he noted that his Tribunal determined he was innocent on May 9, 2005.  He said he was appealing directly to Rice because he had tried all other options.

Asylum in Albania 

On May 5, 2006, the Department of Defense announced that they had transferred five Uyghurs, who had been determined not to have been enemy combatants, to Albania.
Seventeen other Uyghurs continue to be held at Guantanamo because their CSRTs decided they were enemy combatants.

The McClatchy interview

On June 15, 2008, the McClatchy News Service published articles based on interviews with 66 former Guantanamo captives.  McClatchy reporters interviewed Ahmed Adil.
During his interview Ahmed Adil described life in the Uyghur construction camp:

Ahmed Adil told his interviewers that he spent long periods in solitary confinement, in a cell that was only 3 x 6 feet, and that he was always chained to the floor during his interrogations.

References 

Chinese extrajudicial prisoners of the United States
Guantanamo detainees known to have been released
Living people
1973 births
Year of birth uncertain
Uyghurs